Etienne Audibert, (May 14, 1888 – June 6, 1954) was a French engineer, a Mayor of Senlis, a Vice President of Conseil général des mines, the second chairman of Électricité de France (EDF) from 1947 to 1949, a Chair of Charbonnages de France, and a directeur général of CERCHAR.

Career
Audibert was a student of the Christian school in Mées and then at the l'Institution Sainte-Geneviève in Versailles.

In 1907, Audibert began studies at the École polytechnique and was ranked 6th in his class of 170 students during the admissions process.

In January 1941, Audibert became the Mayor of the town of Senlis.

Audibert was arrested by the Sicherheitsdienst on June 7, 1944 and transported to the Neuengamme concentration camp. He returned to France on May 18, 1945.

Awards
 Knight of the Legion of Honour (June 30, 1925)
 Officer of the Legion of Honour (December 31, 1938)
 Commander of the Legion of Honour (October 16, 1946)
 Grand Officer of the Legion of Honour (December 14, 1949)
 Resistance Medal

He was awarded the Melchett Medal from the Energy Institute in 1940.

On January 18, 1951, the medal of the British Institute of Mining Engineers was awarded to Audibert for the year 1950, in recognition of his contributions to the mining industry. Audibert was the second person from France to receive this distinction.

Publications

References

External links  
 patronsdefrance.fr

1888 births
École Polytechnique
Mines Paris - PSL alumni
20th-century French engineers
Électricité de France
1954 deaths
Recipients of the Legion of Honour
People from Senlis
Recipients of the Resistance Medal
Neuengamme concentration camp survivors